The Betfair European Tour 2012/2013 – Event 2 (also known as the 2012 Gdynia Open) was a professional minor-ranking snooker tournament that took place over 16–18 August 2012 at the World Snooker Academy in Sheffield, England with the first three rounds and 5–7 October 2012 at the Gdynia Sports Arena in Gdynia, Poland from the last 32 onwards.

Neil Robertson won his 12th professional title by defeating Jamie Burnett 4–3 in the final.

Prize fund and ranking points
The breakdown of prize money and ranking points of the event is shown below:

1 Only professional players can earn ranking points.

Main draw

Preliminary round

Best of 7 frames

Main rounds

Top half

Section 1

Section 2

Section 3

Section 4

Bottom half

Section 5

Section 6

Section 7

Section 8

Finals

Century breaks
Only from last 128 onwards.

 141, 103  Stephen Maguire
 140, 106  Michael Holt
 135, 108  David Gilbert
 134  Luca Brecel
 133  Oliver Lines
 132, 131, 102  Jamie Burnett
 131, 105  Robert Milkins
 128, 102  Martin Gould
 127  Paul Davison
 127  Stuart Carrington
 125, 118, 111, 105, 102  Neil Robertson
 123  Liang Wenbo
 122  Mark Joyce
 118  Matthew Stevens
 115, 111  John Higgins

 115  Andrew Higginson
 115  Marcus Campbell
 114, 106  Ding Junhui
 113  Stephen Lee
 112  Allan Taylor
 109  Dechawat Poomjaeng
 109  Rory McLeod
 108  Kyren Wilson
 107, 102  Judd Trump
 104, 100  Fergal O'Brien
 102, 100  Tian Pengfei
 102  Ben Woollaston
 101  Barry Pinches
 100  Joe Perry
 100  Tom Ford

References

2012
E2
2012 in English sport
2012 in Polish sport
Snooker competitions in England
Sports competitions in Sheffield
2010s in Sheffield